Takaya is a Japanese electronics company.

Takaya may also refer to:

Takaya (name)
Takaya Station
Takaya (wolf), a Canadian lone wolf

See also
Komoriutanosato-Takaya Station